Kur Bolagh or Kurbolagh may refer to:
 Kur Bolagh, Ardabil
 Kur Bolagh, East Azerbaijan
 Kur Bolagh 1, Kermanshah Province
 Kur Bolagh 2, Kermanshah Province
 Kur Bolagh-e Patiabad, Kermanshah Province
 Kur Bolagh, West Azerbaijan

See also
 Kura Bolagh (disambiguation)